Ansara is a surname. Notable people with the surname include:

Alice Ansara, Australian actress and dramaturg, daughter of Martha
Martha Ansara (born 1942), Australian film director, screenwriter, and cinematographer
Michael Ansara (1922–2013), Syrian-born American actor and voice actor